Saidpur Government College, Saidpur, Nilphamari is an honors-level degree college organised by the National University and the Dinajpur Board of Intermediate and Secondary Education. Established in 1953 under the name "Kay-A-De Azam", the college was the first to open in both the city of Saidpur and Nilphamari District, and was renamed as "Saidpur Government College" in 2018. Saidpur's central Shaheed Minar is located on its campus.

Courses
 Intermediate level (H.S.C)
 Four-years Honor's course
 Degree Pass course
 Open university (H.S.C, Degree pass course, Four-year Honor's course)
 Syllabus: National Curriculum and Textbook Board In Bengali.

References

External links
 Saidpur College on Facebook

Colleges in Nilphamari District
Universities and colleges in Nilphamari District
1953 establishments in East Pakistan